Johannes "Jan" Antonius Constantius Marie Grijseels (October 6, 1890 – May 10, 1961) was a Dutch track and field athlete, who competed in the 1912 Summer Olympics. He was a seventeenfold Dutch champion in all track events running up from 100 to 800 metres.

Grijseels was born in Abcoude-Proosdij and died in Noordwijkerhout.

In 1912 he was eliminated in the semi-finals of the 200 metres competition. In the 100 metres event he was eliminated in the first round.

References

External links
list of Dutch athletes

1890 births
1961 deaths
Dutch male sprinters
Athletes (track and field) at the 1912 Summer Olympics
Olympic athletes of the Netherlands
People from Abcoude
19th-century Dutch people
20th-century Dutch people
Sportspeople from Utrecht (province)